The 2017 Northeast Conference women's soccer tournament was the postseason women's soccer tournament for the Northeast Conference held on November 3 and 5, 2017. The three-match tournament took place at University Stadium in Teaneck, New Jersey, home of the regular season co-champions and tournament #1 seed Fairleigh Dickinson Knights. The four-team single-elimination tournament consisted of two rounds based on seeding from regular season conference play. The defending champions were the Saint Francis Red Flash and they successfully defended their title, winning the penalty shoot-out tiebreaking procedure following a tie with Fairleigh Dickinson in the final. This was the fourth Northeast Conference tournament title for the Saint Francis women's soccer program, all of which have come under the direction of head coach Brenda van Stralen.

Bracket

Schedule

Semifinals

Final

Statistics

Goalscorers 

1 Goal
 Jenna Rae Covello - Central Connecticut
 Mariana Jaleca - St. Francis
 Gabi Morales - St. Francis
 Kristine Neri - Fairleigh Dickinson
 Kylie Ratelle - Bryant
 Jessi Reinhardt - Fairleigh Dickinson

See also 
 Northeast Conference
 2017 NCAA Division I women's soccer season
 2017 NCAA Division I Women's Soccer Tournament
 2017 Northeast Conference Men's Soccer Tournament

References

External links 
2017 Northeast Conference Women's Soccer Tournament

Northeast Conference Women's Soccer Tournament
2017 Northeast Conference women's soccer season